Scott Thomas Armstrong Jr. (October 12, 1913 – August 20, 1997) was an American professional basketball player. He played in the National Basketball League for the Fort Wayne General Electrics, Oshkosh All-Stars, and Indianapolis Kautskys. Armstrong was an NBL all-star during his lone season on Oshkosh (1938–39). While living in Indianapolis, Indiana and playing for the Kautskys, he also served as an assistant coach for Butler University's men's basketball team, his alma mater where he had previously played. Armstrong's post-basketball life included serving in the United States Navy and becoming a principal of a junior high school.

References

1913 births
1997 deaths
American men's basketball players
Basketball players from Fort Wayne, Indiana
Butler Bulldogs men's basketball coaches
Butler Bulldogs men's basketball players
Centers (basketball)
Fort Wayne General Electrics players
Forwards (basketball)
Indianapolis Kautskys players
Oshkosh All-Stars players
Sportspeople from Fort Wayne, Indiana